Captain Bellamy may refer to:

Piracy

 Pirate Captain Samuel Bellamy (1689–1717), notorious pirate from the 18th century, known as "Black Sam"
 Captain Charles Bellamy, another pirate captain from the 18th century.

In fiction
 James Bellamy (Upstairs, Downstairs), a character from Upstairs Downstairs
 A character from The Pirates! in an Adventure with Scientists
 A minor character from Pirates of the Caribbean: Dead Man's Chest